Sättelstädt (lit. Saddletown) is a village and a former municipality in the Wartburg district, Thuringia, Germany. In 1996 it was merged into municipality of Hörselberg, which became part of Hörselberg-Hainich in 2007. It is one of the 17 Ortsteile (subdivisions) of Hörselberg-Hainich. Its population is 580 (2021).

References

Former municipalities in Thuringia
Wartburgkreis